Heinz-Werner Eggeling (born 17 April 1955) is a retired German football forward.

References

External links
 

1955 births
Living people
German footballers
Bundesliga players
2. Bundesliga players
VfL Bochum players
Eintracht Braunschweig players
KFC Uerdingen 05 players
Borussia Dortmund players
VfL Osnabrück players
Germany B international footballers
Association football forwards